General elections were held in Bosnia and Herzegovina on 14 September 1996. Voter turnout was 79.4% in the parliamentary election and 80.4% in the presidential election.

The elections for the House of Representatives were divided into two; one for the  Federation of Bosnia and Herzegovina and one for Republika Srpska. In the presidential election, voters in the Federation elected Bosniak Alija Izetbegović and Croat Krešimir Zubak, while voters in Republika Srpska elected Serb Momčilo Krajišnik. The Party of Democratic Action emerged as the largest party in the House of Representatives, winning 19 of the 42 seats.

Alija Izetbegović's 730,592 votes for the Bosniak seat in the Presidency, remain the highest ever total vote count for a Presidency member in a Bosnian general election. The percentage of the vote received by Krešimir Zubak for the Croat seat in the Presidency – 88.7% – is the highest of any Presidency member to date.

Results

Presidency

House of Representatives

By entity

References

External links
Noel Malcolm, Observations on the Bosnian Elections, Bosnian Report No. 17 (November 1996 - January 1997), Bosnian Institute, London 1996

1996 in Bosnia and Herzegovina
Elections in Bosnia and Herzegovina
Bosnia
September 1996 events in Europe